Jingga 13 is a Malaysian first national Non profit organisation closely related to People's Justice Party (PKR) dedicated in supporting the Reformasi movement in Malaysia since 2011 and was labeled as pro-Pakatan Rakyat (PR) and its successor Pakatan Harapan (PH).

Jingga 13 is also a PKR's supported anti-corruption movement NGO.

References

External links 
 Official website Jingga 13 
 Official Facebook Jingga 13 

2011 establishments in Malaysia
Political organisations based in Malaysia
Non-profit organisations based in Malaysia
Political advocacy groups in Malaysia